Yanna Hadatty Mora (born Guayaquil, 1969) is an Ecuadorian short story writer and essayist.

Biography
Haddatty has lived in Mexico since 1992, where she completed her higher education and worked as a professor. She earned her doctorate in Ibero-American Literature from the Autonomous University of Mexico (UNAM), where she later worked as a professor and researcher of contemporary literature. She also taught at the University of the Cloister of Sor Juana and at the UAM Xochimilco.

Memberships
She is a full member of the House of Ecuadorian Culture and Executive Secretary of the Association of Ecuadorianists in Mexico.

She has been a member of the National System of Researchers of Mexico since 2005.

Works

Short story
 Quehaceres postergados (Guayaquil, 1998)

Essay
 Autofagia y narración (Madrid: Iberoamericana, 2003)
 La ciudad paroxista (México: UNAM, 2009)

Anthology

Her works have been included in the following anthologies

 El libro de los abuelos (Guayaquil, 1990)
 Cuento contigo (Guayaquil, 1993)
 Antología de narradoras ecuatorianas (Quito, 1997)
 40 cuentos ecuatorianos (Guayaquil, 1997)
 Antología básica del cuento ecuatoriano (Quito, 1998)
 Nós e os outros. Histórias de diferentes culturas (São Paulo, 2000)

References 

1969 births
Ecuadorian women writers
Ecuadorian women short story writers
Ecuadorian short story writers
People from Guayaquil
National Autonomous University of Mexico alumni
Academic staff of the National Autonomous University of Mexico
Living people
Ecuadorian essayists
20th-century Ecuadorian women writers
21st-century Ecuadorian women writers
Ecuadorian expatriates in Mexico
20th-century short story writers
21st-century short story writers
20th-century essayists
21st-century essayists